Maaf Mahalleh (also Romanized as Ma‘āf Maḩalleh; also known as  Mīr Maḩalleh and Mīr Maḩalleh va Mo‘āf Maḩalleh) is a village in Rud Pish Rural District, in the Central District of Fuman County, Gilan Province, Iran. At the 2006 census, its population was 277, in 83 families.

References 

Populated places in Fuman County